Shohada Metro Station is a station on Isfahan Metro Line 1. The station opened on 15 October 2015. It is located at Shohada Square at the beginning of Chaharbagh Payin Avenue in Isfahan. The next station on the north side is Shahid Bahonar Station and on the southern side is Takhti Station

References

Isfahan Metro stations
Railway stations opened in 2015